Lebohang Monaheng (born 12 August 1970) is a former Minister of Lesotho. He was serving as the Minister of Public Works from May 2020 to October 2022.

Background and education 
Monaheng was born in 1970 in Maseru District and grew up in Makhaleng in Lesotho. Monaheng got his primary school certificate from Lithabaneng Primary School, Maseru and his high school certificate from Masianokeng High School, Lesotho.  In 1994, Monaheng received a Diploma in Motor Mechanics from Technical School in Leribe District in Lesotho.

Career 
Monaheng started his career as an Assistant Clerk in Lesotho Communication, he also worked at a Moolman Construction as a Mechanic. Monaheng occupied other positions in different firms before he went into politics in 2004 and became a member of Lesotho congress for democracy.

References 

Living people
1970 births